GOG is a handball club based in the small town of Gudme on Funen, Denmark. The club is one of the most successful in the history of Danish handball having won the Danish Handball Championship 8 times and the Danish Handball Cup a record 10 times. Currently GOG  competes in the men's Danish Handball League.

History

GOG
The club was founded on 1 May 1973 as a result of a merger between Gudbjerg, Oure, and Gudme. GOG got promoted to the best league in Denmark in 1987 and won its first Danish Handball Championship in 1992.

GOG Svendborg TGI
In 2005, GOG and Svendborg TGI merged their first teams. The club won the Danish championship for men in 2006/2007. In 2009 the women's team was separated from GOG and became HC Odense. On 26 January 2010, GOG Svendborg TGI was declared bankrupt and relegated to the 2nd Division.

GOG 2010
In March 2010, the club was reformed as GOG 2010 A/S, with Kasper Jørgensen as new CEO and Hemming Van as chairman of the board. After the 2010–11 season the club was promoted to Danish 1st Division. In the 2012/2013 season, GOG managed to win the 1st division and was promoted back to the men's Danish Men's Handball League.

Honours
Danish Handball League: 8
: 1992, 1995, 1996, 1998, 2000, 2004, 2007, 2022
: 1988, 1989, 1991, 1993, 1994, 2001, 2006, 2008, 2019, 2020
Danish Handball Cup:  11 (record)
: 1990, 1991, 1992, 1995, 1996, 1997, 2002, 2003, 2005, 2019, 2022
: 1993, 2001, 2007, 2008, 2021
EHF Cup Winners' Cup
: 1995
 Double
 Winners (3): 1991–92, 1994–95, 1995–96

Team

Current squad
Squad for the 2022–23 season

Goalkeeper
 12  Matthias Rex Dorgelo 
 16  Tobias Thulin
Left Wingers
 9  Jerry Tollbring
 23  Joachim Lyng Als
 43  Emil La Cour Andersen
Right Wingers
 19  Oskar Vind Rasmussen
 21  Kasper Emil Kildelund
Pivots
 6  Henrik Jakobsen
 14  Lukas Jørgensen
 22  Anders Zachariassen

Left Backs
 2  Simon Pytlick
 3  Nicolai Nygaard Pedersen
 10  Christoffer Sundsgaard Dreyer
 77  Frederik Kiehn Clausen (c)
Centre Backs
 15  Lauritz Reinholdt Legér
 34  Morten Olsen
Right Backs
 11  Emil Wernsdoff Madsen
 29  Hjalte Lykke
 33  Nejc Cehte

Technical staff

 Head Coach:  Nicolej Krickau
 Assistant Coach:  Keld Wilhelmsen
 Team Leader:  Bent Møller

Transfers
Transfers for the season 2023–24

Joining
  Alexander Blonz (LW) (from  SC Pick Szeged)
  Emil Tonnesen (LB) (promoted to first team)
  Aaron Mensing (LB) (from  SG Flensburg-Handewitt) ?
  Linus Persson (RB) (from  HBC Nantes)

Leaving
  Jerry Tollbring (LW) (to  Füchse Berlin)
  Emil La Cour Andersen (LW) (to  TMS Ringsted)
  Simon Pytlick (LB) (to  SG Flensburg-Handewitt)
  Morten Olsen (CB) (retires) (assistant coach to  TMS Ringsted)
  Lukas Jørgensen (P) (to  SG Flensburg-Handewitt)

European Handball

EHF Champions League

EHF Cup

EHF Cup Winners' Cup

Notable former players
Men

 Mikkel Hansen
 Lasse Svan Hansen
 Anders Eggert
 Joachim Boldsen
 Nikolaj Jacobsen
 Søren Stryger
 Kevin Møller
 Bent Møller
 Søren Haagen
 Thomas Mogensen
 Niklas Landin Jacobsen
 Kasper Nielsen
 Torsten Laen
 Peter Henriksen
 Klavs Bruun Jørgensen
 Henrik Gerster
 Lasse Møller
 Mathias Gidsel
 Emil Jakobsen
 Magnus Jernemyr
 Fredrik Petersen
 Ásgeir Örn Hallgrímsson
 Snorri Guðjónsson
 Jakob Larsen
 Espen Christensen
 Ole Erevik (2017–2018)

Women

 Rikke Hørlykke
 Trine Jensen
 Gitte Sunesen
 Line Jørgensen
 Mette Iversen Sahlholdt
 Inna Suslina
 Anna Kareeva
 Pearl van der Wissel
 Monique Feijen
 Joyce Hilster
 Ana Razdorov
 Birgit van Os
 Olga Assink
 Elly an de Boer
 Saskia Mulder
 Natasja Burgers
 Anette Hovind Johansen
 Ragnhild Aamodt
 Aiko Hayafune
 Krisztina Nagy
 Tina Flognman

Notable former coaches

 Jan Pytlick
 Guðmundur Guðmundsson
 Ulf Schefvert

External links
 http://www.gog.dk/

References

Danish handball clubs
Svendborg Municipality
Handball clubs established in 2005
Handball clubs established in 2010
2005 establishments in Denmark
2010 establishments in Denmark